The Mixed synchronized 3 metre springboard competition at the 2017 World Championships was held on 22 July 2017.

Results
The final was started at 14:00.

References

Mixed synchronized 3 metre springboard
World Aquatics Championships